Granlibakken is a conference center and lodge that operates year-round one mile (1.6 km) southwest of Tahoe City, California. The small ski hill at Granlibakken may be Lake Tahoe’s oldest ski resort.

History
Circa 1928, the Tahoe Tavern hotel built a double toboggan slide there. Horse-drawn sleighs shuttled guests to and from what became known as "Olympic Hill" which was also frequented by Tahoe City families.

At about the same time, a group of Norwegian skiers, including seven-time national champion Lars Haugen, was touring the west and giving ski jumping exhibitions. The Tahoe Tavern directors hired Haugen to design a 60-meter ski jump at Olympic Hill, which took two years and $10,000 to complete.

The Lake Tahoe Ski Club, founded in 1929, helped organize events and exhibitions at Olympic Hill throughout the 1930s, including the United States Ski Championships in February 1932. It wasn’t until after World War II, however, that a recreational ski resort was developed there.

Kjell “Rusty” Rustad, a retired sea captain and former ski jumper, had moved from San Francisco to Lake Tahoe because it reminded him of his home in Norway. With the goal of providing local skiing for Tahoe City residents, he secured a land use permit from the U.S. Forest Service and purchased  in the Olympic Hill valley. Rustad cleared an area for the ski slope, installed a  rope to the top of it, and constructed three buildings for overnight guests as well as a day lodge.

Rustad named the ski area Granlibakken (which is Norwegian for “hillside sheltered by fir trees”), after slopes he had skied as a boy in Norway. In 1947, he began bringing skiers from the road to his resort aboard a surplus World War II landing craft (rented from Squaw Valley’s Wayne Poulsen) that could navigate the snow. Granlibakken continued to attract ski jumpers, as well as downhill skiers, thanks to construction of a small jump, next to the wider slope, in 1952.

With a location protected from heavy winds and strong sun, the ski area enjoyed a longer season and its reputation grew beyond the local area. In 1953, Rustad sold acreage across the road to University of California (UC) Berkeley’s International House. The organization’s volunteers built a lodge there. Bought by the UC Alumni association in 1958, the lodge became a year-round education and recreation center with dining room, swimming pool and beds for 150. In 1968, a New York publisher, Hugh Miller, bought the property. Changing the name to the Four Seasons at Lake Tahoe, he built the first condos in the valley.

Bill and Norma Parson purchased the resort in 1978, reviving it and the original name. The Parson family continues to operate Granlibakken today, keeping the ski hill open, in Parson’s words, "I suppose for historic reasons."

See also
List of convention centers in the United States

References

External links
Granlibakken

Convention centers in California
Resorts in California
Ski areas and resorts in California
Buildings and structures in Placer County, California
Tourist attractions in Placer County, California
Sports venues in Placer County, California
Ski jumping venues in the United States